The Dominion Post is the only commercial daily newspaper in Morgantown, West Virginia. It formed from the merger of the Morgantown New Dominion and the Morgantown News into the Morgantown Dominion-News which, in turn, merged with the Morgantown Post. The term New Dominion was a reference to Virginia's state nickname of "Old Dominion", referencing the separation of West Virginia from Virginia in 1863.

While it dominates the local market, the Dominion Post has competition with the Fairmont Times-West Virginian in the rural counties surrounding Morgantown. As Morgantown is considered part of the Pittsburgh television market, the Dominion Post has a news partnership with KDKA-TV in Pittsburgh, serving as a second news partner to the station alongside the Pittsburgh Post-Gazette, covering West Virginia topics for the station.

The newspaper is owned by John Raese and his brother David Raese. John Raese was an unsuccessful Republican candidate for the United States Senate in 1984, 2006, and 2011 and for Governor in 1988. They also own the West Virginia Radio Corporation and its Metro News division, however, the two news operations do not share resources.

History
The Dominion Post traces its roots to 1864 when The Morgantown Weekly Post was founded. In 1876, the other predecessor of the paper, The New Dominion was founded. In 1930, The New Dominion became The Dominion News. Around this time, the two papers formed the West Virginia Newspaper Publishing Company and consolidated their publishing operations. It was not until 1973 that the two papers officially merged and became The Dominion Post.

Online Edition
The Dominion Post had a free online edition available from 1996 until January 2005, when they switched to an online subscription for digital content. The Dominion Post's website, dominionpost.com, allows users to see and navigate the individual stories published by the newspaper as well as have access to a pdf. version of the daily print edition they refer to as the "e-edition".

See also
 List of newspapers in West Virginia

References

Further reading

External links

Newspapers published in West Virginia
Companies based in Morgantown, West Virginia